My Prescription is the second studio album by American singer-songwriter Bobby Womack. The album was released in February 1970, by Minit Records. It was arranged by Bobby Womack, Glen Spreen and Mike Leech. The cover photography was by Herb Kravitz.

Track listing
All tracks composed by Bobby Womack and Darryl Carter; except where indicated

References

1970 albums
Bobby Womack albums
Albums produced by Chips Moman
Minit Records albums